Dream Your Dream is the fourth extended play by South Korean-Chinese girl group WJSN. It was released on February 27, 2018, by Starship Entertainment, and distributed by LOEN Entertainment. It contains a total of six songs, including a Korean and a Chinese version of the lead single "Dreams Come True".

Background and release 
On January 21, Starship Entertainment revealed that WJSN would return on February 27. With a comeback schedule being released on February 4 through the group's official Twitter and Instagram accounts, it revealed that WJSN would be releasing their fourth extended play titled Dream Your Dream. Starship Entertainment released teasers of each unit from February 5 to February 7, along with a full group teaser being released two days later. WJSN released another group teaser on February 13. The release of album's tracklist on February 21 revealed the name of the lead single, "Dreams Come True", composed by Full8loom. The teaser of the music video for "Dreams Come True" was released on February 23.

WJSN held their comeback showcase at Yes 24 Live Hall on February 27, the same day as the album's release, where they performed the lead single "Dreams Come True" for the first time. It was broadcast live through Naver app V-Live.

Track listing

Charts

Weekly

Monthly

Release history

References 

Korean-language EPs
Cosmic Girls EPs
Starship Entertainment EPs
2018 EPs